The Nord 3400 Norbarbe was a French two-seat observation and casualty-evacuation aircraft built by Nord Aviation for the French Army Light Aviation.

Design and development
The Nord 3400 was designed to meet a French Army requirement for a two-seat observation aircraft, with a secondary casualty-evacuation role. The 3400 was a braced high-wing monoplane with a fixed tailwheel landing gear and an enclosed cabin with tandem seating for a pilot and observer. The prototype F-MBTD first flew on 20 January 1958, powered by a  Potez 4D-30 engine. A second prototype with an increased wing area followed, being powered by a  Potez 4D-34 engine. A production batch of 150 was ordered by the French Army in the same configuration as the second prototype.

Variants
Nord 3400-01 First prototype, powered by a  Potez 4D-30 engine, with,  span/ area, wings.
Nord 3400 Production aircraft (and 2nd prototype), with a more powerful  Potez 4D-34 engine and increased span/area wings.

Operators

French Army Light Aviation
National Gendarmerie

Specifications (Nord 3400)

See also

References

Further reading

External links

Photos at airliners.net

1950s French military utility aircraft
3400
Single-engined tractor aircraft
High-wing aircraft
Aircraft first flown in 1958